Wira Apachita (Aymara wira the ground or anything which goes downhill, apachita the place of transit of an important pass in the principal routes of the Andes; name in the Andes for a stone cairn built along the trail in the high mountains, Hispanicized spelling Huira Apacheta) is a  mountain in the Andes of Peru, about  high. It is located in the Puno Region, Lampa Province, Palca District. Wira Apachita is situated northeast of the lake Sayt'uqucha and the mountain Yanawara.

References

Mountains of Puno Region
Mountains of Peru